Băduleşti may refer to several villages in Romania:

 Băduleşti, a village in Uda, Argeș
 Băduleşti, a village in Crângurile Commune, Dâmboviţa County